The Cline Falls axe attack refers to an unsolved attempted homicide that occurred on the evening of June 22, 1977, at the Cline Falls State Park in Deschutes County, Oregon United States. The victims were two female college students, Terri Jentz and her roommate, Avra Goldman, who were on a cross-country cycling ride along the Trans America Trail.

Both women decided to spend the night along the Deschutes River at the park near Redmond. During the night, they were awoken by a vehicle that drove over their tent, injuring both. The driver of the vehicle exited his car and proceeded to attack both women with an axe. Both women survived the attack, suffering significant injuries, but their attacker has never been positively identified.

Timeline

Background
In the summer of 1977, 19-year-old Terri Jentz of Western Springs, Illinois, and her roommate, 20-year-old Avra Goldman of Wellesley, Massachusetts, were both Yale University students who decided to cycle across the United States via the newly-opened Trans America Trail. Upon completing their tour, which ended in Astoria, Oregon, both women headed east through the state. On the night of June 22, they stopped at the Cline Falls State Park in rural Deschutes County and decided to camp there overnight along the river.

Jentz would later recall being unnerved by the location, and that both women felt as though they were being watched: "It was an animal instinct of danger, and we both had it, we both had it separately and we shared it with one another."

Attack
Around 11:30 p.m., while both women were asleep in their tent, they were awoken by the sound of a truck pulling up to their campsite. Jentz initially believed the vehicle was driven by partying teenagers who had driven up to the campsite. The vehicle then proceeded to drive over the tent before stopping, its tires pinning Jentz to the ground at her chest, breaking both of her arms, one leg, her collarbone, and several ribs, as well as crushing her lung. A man exited the vehicle carrying an axe, and struck Goldman in the head with it around six times. After, the man stood over Jentz. She recalled:

After Jentz begged the man, he returned to his vehicle and drove away. Though severely injured, Jentz managed to stumble to a nearby road, where she flagged down Bill Penhollow and Darlene Gervais, two teenagers who were passing by. Gervais recalled that Jentz was "so bloody it was dripping off her hair...  the ends of her hair." Penhollow and Gervais drove to the campsite to tend to Goldman, who was severely injured, and while doing so noticed a pair of headlights appear in the distance at the edge of the park, which frightened them as they assumed it to be the attacker returning to the scene. The vehicle, however, drove away.

Investigation

Initial response
Police arrived at the Cline Falls campsite after midnight on June 23, and began investigating the scene. Both Jentz and Goldman were taken to St. Charles Medical Center in Bend, where Goldman underwent a nine-hour emergency brain operation.

Interviews and suspects
Detectives were unable to obtain a rounded description of the attacker from the victims; Goldman, who had sustained serious brain trauma, remembered nothing of the attack. Jentz, who was conscious throughout, did not see the face of the assailant, but described him as a physically-fit, "young cowboy" based on his clothing and stature.

In the weeks following the attack, a local woman in Redmond told authorities that she had been told that the attacker was a local young man named Richard "Dick" Damm (born November 10, 1959), then 17 years old. Damm was interviewed by detectives on several occasions, and it was discovered he had been in a fight with his girlfriend, Janey Fraley, around the date of the attack, though he never disclosed his specific whereabouts the night of June 22. Fraley denied that the two were fighting on that day, though she stated the two did fight often. After a polygraph examination taken by Damm proved inconclusive, he was given a second polygraph on July 14, 1977. The results of the second polygraph were shown to be "deceptive," though the validity of these results were called into question when it was discovered Damm was under the influence of methamphetamine during the examination. The results of both polygraph examinations were subsequently analyzed by laboratories in Salem, the state capitol, and it was the opinion of the analysts that Damm showed deception in both.

Fraley later told authorities that she had noticed Damm changed the tires on his truck shortly after the attack, and that a toolbox located in the truck bed had been removed. She also conceded to police that Damm had been abusive to her throughout their relationship.

Another suspect in the attack was convicted child rapist and murderer Richard Wayne "Bud" Godwin. After the attack, Godwin was imprisoned for the murder of a five-year-old child, whose skull he used as a candle holder. On the night of Jentz and Goldman's attack, a female relative of Godwin'swith whom he had allegedly had a sexual relationshipwas possibly staying at the Cline Falls park. Despite law enforcement's considering of Godwin as a suspect, Jentz stated that he did not resemble the man she recalled attacking her.

Later developments
Both Jentz and Goldman survived their attack and recovered from their injuries, though Goldman was left with vision problems resulting from her head trauma. In September 1977, Goldman's parents donated $3,000 to St. Charles Medical Center into a fund for critical-care monitoring equipment under the names of Penhollow and Gervais, the two teenagers who found Jentz and Goldman and helped save them.

In 2006, Jentz published a book recounting her life after the attack, titled Strange Piece of Paradise. While researching in preparation for the book, she discovered that the official records of the attack, including interviews, physical evidence, and crime scene photos, had been inadvertently lost.

Notes

References

Works cited

External links
2006 interview with Jentz

June 1977 events in the United States
Axe attacks
1977 in Oregon
Crimes in Oregon
Unsolved crimes in the United States
1977 crimes in the United States
June 1977 crimes
Violence against women in the United States
History of women in Oregon